Marta is the surname of the following people:
Eneida Marta, singer from Guinea-Bissau active since 1990s
István Márta (born 1952), Hungarian composer and theater and festival director
Jack Marta (1903–1991), American cinematographer
Lynne Marta (born 1946), American actress
Pyotr Marta (born 1952), Soviet freestyle wrestler
Robert Marta (1943–2017), American cameraman, Society of Operating Cameramen first president, son of Jack Marta 
Samer Al Marta (born 1972), Kuwaiti footballer